Blue Earth is a studio album by American alt country and alt rock band the Jayhawks, released in 1989.

History
After the local release of their debut album The Jayhawks, the band recorded a set of demos in order to attract a major label deal. Singer/guitarist Gary Louris was injured in a car accident and left the band. Their manager was able to interest Twin/Tone Records in releasing the demos. Louris went to the studio to overdub his guitar parts and ended up re-joining the band. The re-mixed demos were released as Blue Earth.

"Martin's Song" and "Two Angels" were later re-recorded on Hollywood Town Hall.

Blue Earth was re-issued on CD on the Rykodisc label in 2003 with three bonus tracks.

Reception

In his review for AllMusic, critic Jason Ankeny wrote that due to the songs originally being demos, they lack punch, and noted "the songs are simply too primitive to come to life in this setting. Nonetheless, the growth of the band's songwriting skills over their debut is substantial..." Music critic Robert Christgau gave the album an A− rating, noting "Gram Parsons comparisons get you nowhere, but I'm not kidding—this is the obliquely songful followup the Burritos never made."

Track listing

Personnel
Mark Olson – vocals, guitar, harmonica
Gary Louris – vocals, guitar
Marc Perlman – electric and acoustic bass
Thad Spencer – drums

Additional musicians
Dan Gaarder – lead guitar (on "Ain't No End", "Five Cups of Coffee", "Dead End Angel")
Charlie Pine – organ (on "Sioux City")
Norm Rogers – vocals (on "Sioux City")
Jim Rondinelli – vocals (on "Red Firecracker")

Production'
Produced by Jim Rondinelli, Tom Herbers and the Jayhawks

References

External links
Jayhawks fan site discography.

1989 albums
The Jayhawks albums
Twin/Tone Records albums